Kermia lutea is a species of sea snail, a marine gastropod mollusk in the family Raphitomidae.

Description
The length of the shell attains 7 mm.

(Original description) The fusiform, solid shell is shining. The whorls are convex, angulated at the sutures and longitudinally regularly and closely ribbed, crossed by regular transverse ridges. The aperture is narrow. The  outer lip is thick and denticulated within. The siphonal canal is produced aud recurved. The colour of the shell is light yellowish-brown.

Distribution
This marine species occurs off the Bonins, Japan; Philippines

References

 Dudgeon, D.; Morton, B. (1982). The coral associated Mollusca of Tolo Harbour and Channel, Hong Kong. In: Morton B, editor. Proceedings of the first international marine biological workshop: The marine flora and fauna of Hong Kong and southern China. Hong Kong University Press, Hong Kong. 2: 627–650
 Severns, M. (2011). Shells of the Hawaiian Islands - The Sea Shells
 Liu J.Y. [Ruiyu] (ed.). (2008). Checklist of marine biota of China seas. China Science Press. 1267 pp. . Conchbooks, Hackenheim. 564 pp.

External links

 
 Gastropods.com: Kermia lutea
 Melvill J.C. & Standen R. (1896) Notes on a collection of shells from Lifu and Uvea, Loyalty Islands, formed by the Rev. James and Mrs. Hadfield, with list of species. Part II. Journal of Conchology 8: 273-315

lutea
Gastropods described in 1860